Viscount Bearsted, of Maidstone in the County of Kent, is a title in the Peerage of the United Kingdom. It was created in 1925 for the businessman Marcus Samuel, 1st Baron Bearsted, the joint-founder of the Shell Transport and Trading Company. He had already been created a Baronet in the Baronetage of the United Kingdom in 1903 and Baron Bearsted, of Maidstone in the County of Kent, in 1921, also in the Peerage of the United Kingdom. The titles descended from father to son until the death of his grandson, the third Viscount, in 1986.

The late Viscount was succeeded by his younger brother, the fourth Viscount. , the titles are held by the latter's son, the fifth Viscount, who succeeded in 1996.

The family seat is Farley Hall, near Swallowfield, Berkshire.

Viscounts Bearsted (1925)
Marcus Samuel, 1st Viscount Bearsted (1853–1927)
Walter Horace Samuel, 2nd Viscount Bearsted (1882–1948)
Marcus Richard Samuel, 3rd Viscount Bearsted (1909–1986)
Peter Montefiore Samuel, 4th Viscount Bearsted (1911–1996)
Nicholas Alan Samuel, 5th Viscount Bearsted (b. 1950)

The heir apparent is the present holder's son Hon. Harry Richard Samuel (b. 1988).

Arms

References

Kidd, Charles, Williamson, David (editors). Debrett's Peerage and Baronetage (1990 edition). New York: St Martin's Press, 1990.
Paternal Ancestry of the 5th Viscount Bearsted
Maternal Ancestry of the 5th Viscount Bearsted

External links

Living people
Viscountcies in the Peerage of the United Kingdom
Noble titles created in 1925
Year of birth missing (living people)